CILM-FM is a French-language Canadian radio station located in Saguenay, Quebec. The station carries adult contemporary format as part of the Rythme FM network. 

Owned by Cogeco, it broadcasts on 98.3 MHz using a directional antenna with an average effective radiated power of 51,000 watts and a peak effective radiated power of 100,000 watts (class C1). Before 2007, the station was heard on the AM band on 590 kHz with a daytime power of 25,000 watts and a nighttime power of 7,500 watts as a class B station, using a directional antenna with slightly different daytime and nighttime directional patterns in order to protect various other stations on that frequency. CKRS went on the air on June 24, 1947. The station broadcasts from the CBC Tower on Warren Street in Chicoutimi.

It was previously part of the Corus Québec (formerly Radiomédia) network which operates across Quebec. In March 2009, Corus announced plans to drop the talk format on CKRS, CJRC-FM in Gatineau, CHLN-FM in Trois-Rivières and CHLT-FM in Sherbrooke in favour of a hybrid talk / classic hits-oldies format branded as "Souvenirs Garantis", effective March 28, 2009.

In early 2010, the local morning news show featuring Myriam Ségal (previously before for several years by Louis Champagne) was removed in favor of Puisqu'il faut se lever, a province-wide news and discussion program from CHMP-FM in Montreal, hosted by Paul Arcand. Puisqu'il faut se lever was dumped by CKRS-FM a year later, in February 2011, and the station returned to a local morning news show.

On June 25, 2010 it was reported that Corus has agreed to sell CKRS-FM to a local business group known as Radio Saguenay, whose owners include former NHL player and coach Guy Carbonneau. The acquisition received CRTC approval on March 1, 2011.  However, the commission has approved the transfer of the station's management to Radio Saguenay on an interim basis; the station would be rebranded as "FM 98", but maintaining its classic hits format. The sale to Radio Saguenay was fully approved in November 2010.

In March 2011, CKRS-FM changed its music content from classic hits to mainstream rock, while retaining its talk programming.  The station's playlist, however, was heavy on classic rock.

In 2012, the station was sold to Attraction Radio, and was rebranded as "CKRS 98,3". Its music and talk programming continued, though at this point, most of its talk programs are networked from Cogeco.

In May 2014, CKRS filed an application with the CRTC, which would amend its licence to reduce spoken word requirements and enable them to carry more music-based programming, a necessity, as CKRS is seeking to affiliate with Rythme FM. The license amendment would allow CKRS to carry 50 hours of local programming a week and six hours and five minutes of local news each week, with the remainder programmed from Rythme FM. CKRS announced the plans and license change, as ratings have shown that CKRS was one of the market's lowest-rated radio stations, with only 5% of the commercial market share, with competing rock station CKYK-FM commanding a 24% share. The application was approved by the CRTC on November 26, 2014; the amendment includes its minimum local "spoken word" requirement reduced to 21 hours a week. Following the approval, it was announced that CKRS-FM and sister station CKGS-FM would join the Rythme FM network starting February 9, 2015, changing callsign to CILM-FM.

In August 2018, Attraction Radio abandoned the Rythme FM network affiliation for an in-house branding "O". CKGS-FM would break the simulcast of CILM-FM on September 17, 2019, when it adopted the Country-Western format as Hit Country 105,5, with CILM-FM retaining the adult contemporary format.

Cogeco would acquire CILM-FM from Arsenal Media (the renamed Attraction Radio) on April 25, 2022, reintroducing the Rythme FM branding in Saguenay soon after.

References

External links
 

ILM
ILM
ILM
ILM
Radio stations established in 1947
1947 establishments in Quebec